Mahmoud Safwat Ali (16 November 1929 – 12 May 2015) was an intelligence officer in the Egyptian General Intelligence and Security Service and a former gymnastics player in the Egyptian Gymnastics team competing in the Olympic Games in Finland Helsinki 1952. He was rated the 125th on players in overall ranking in the Helsinki summer games.

References

External links 
 
 Mahmoud Safwat's obituary 

1929 births
2015 deaths
Gymnasts at the 1952 Summer Olympics
Egyptian male artistic gymnasts
Olympic gymnasts of Egypt
20th-century Egyptian people